Dingwall Academy is the largest secondary school in the Highlands of Scotland, with an enrolment of 1048 pupils as of August 2018. The Academy is situated in the centre of Dingwall and brings in pupils from Conon Bridge, Maryburgh, Muir of Ord, Strathpeffer, Evanton and the surrounding area.

The school's motto is the Latin "Salve Corona" which translates as "Hail the Crown".

History

The school was originally built in the 1930s and many additions were made throughout the years. In 2005 it was decided a new £28 million school should be built through the PPP agreement as the old building was falling into disrepair and incurred high maintenance costs. The new school building is situated outside the current school in the old sports field. Building began in mid-2005 and a completion date of May 2008 had been agreed on. Dingwall Academy was officially handed over to Highland Council on 20 May 2008, and opened to pupils on 9 June. The new school has a range of classrooms with specialist facilities and incorporates a number of state of the art community facilities such as a drama studio, all-weather pitches and a library which is used by both the school and the community.

Dingwall Academy became the first school from the North of Scotland to win the Scottish School's Football Cup in 1994 beating Cardinal Newman 1-0 in the final at Hampden Park, Glasgow.

School aims

The aim of Dingwall Academy is to enable all children to develop their capacities as successful learners, confident individuals, responsible citizens and effective contributors to society by:

Educating every pupil in accordance with age and ability in a caring and disciplined environment of equal opportunity
Developing the notion that learning is a lifelong process
Imparting a sense of respect both for ourselves and for others recognising the worth of each individual
Preparing the pupils for all aspects of their adult lives and to develop their skills in terms of good citizenship
Providing an all round education including aspects of education not directly related to the curriculum
Developing self-discipline, independent thinking and those skills which will help pupils to reach their full potential

Notable alumni 

 Will Anderson (animator), BAFTA Award winning animator
Kate Forbes, MSP for Skye, Lochaber and Badenoch and Finance Secretary

References

External links

Dingwall Academy's page on Education Scotland's ParentZone
Profile on Highland Council website

Secondary schools in Highland (council area)
Dingwall
Scottish Gaelic-language secondary schools